Homonopsis multilata is a species of moth of the family Tortricidae. It is found in China (Hebei, Henan, Sichuan, Guizhou).

The wingspan is 14.5-16.5 mm for males and 19.5–21 mm for females. The ground colour of the forewings is pale brown with a dark brown median fascia and dark brown subapical blotch. The hindwings are grey with a dark grey apex.

Etymology
The species name refers to the shape of the median fascia of the forewing and is derived from Latin mutilatus (meaning disconnected).

References

Moths described in 2003
Archipini